Giuseppe Nirta may refer to several members of the Nirta 'Ndrangheta  clan from San Luca in Calabria:
Giuseppe Nirta (born 1913) (1913–1995), 'Ndrangheta boss and brother of Antonio Nirta
Giuseppe Nirta (born 1940) (1940–2023), head of the Nirta clan arrested in May 2008
Giuseppe Nirta (born 1973), one of the triggerman in the Duisburg massacre on August 15, 2007